Carmen Luz Barbieri (born 21 April 1955) is an Argentine actress, dancer, stand-up comedian, theatre director and producer. Barbieri was the first winner of Showmatch's Bailando 2006 (paired with professional dancer, Christian Ponce).

Early life
Carmen Barbieri is the daughter of comedian Alfredo Barbieri and granddaughter of guitarist Guillermo Barbieri.

Career
In 1976 she made her film debut in La guerra de los sostenes. The same year she starred in La aventura explosiva. In 1978 she acted in the movie Con mi mujer no pudo and the telenovela Un mundo de veinte asientos, and the following year in El rey de los exhortos, Las muñecas que hacen ¡pum!, Expertos en pinchazos and Hotel de señoritas. In 1980, Barbieri worked on Los superagentes contra todos. In 1985 she appeared with Guillermo Francella in the film El Telo y la Tele. Her last movie was Las Colegialas (1986).

In 1985 Barbieri appeared on the TV show Mesa de Noticias. In 1987 she acted in the series Matrimonios y algo más. In 1992 she conducted Ta Te Show and in 1994 La Revista del Domingo. In 1996 she acted in the series Como pan caliente along with model Claudia Albertario. In 1997 part of the series Cebollitas. The following year she led the program Movete. She joined journalist Marcelo Polino after Georgina Barbarossa ceded her post.

In 2003 led by America 2, she appeared on Cómplices y testigos and 2005 starred in the sitcom ¿Quién es el jefe? with Gianella Neyra and Nicolás Vázquez. In 2006 Barbieri participated in the segment Showmatch Bailando por un sueño, triumphing in the competition.

In the summer 2006 – 2007 she worked in theater and starred in a confrontation with Moria Casan. In 2007 she again competed on Bailando por un sueño. She was eliminated in the tenth week of milonga and while appearing on América network on the morning show El diario de Carmen. She appeared in the play Incomparable with Miguel Angel Cherutti, Celina Rucci and cast on Teatro Neptuno of Mar del Plata. She was a member of the jury of Bailando por un sueño 2008. In 2009 a member of the jury of Bailando por un Sueño Kids with Laura Fidalgo, Reina Reech and Miguel Angel Cherutti. She was recently starring in Bravísima and was again on the jury of Bailando por un sueño 2011. In 2011 she appeared again in theatre show Barbierísima.

Filmography

Theatre

Awards

References

External links

1955 births
Living people
20th-century Argentine actresses
21st-century Argentine actresses
Actresses from Buenos Aires
Argentine film actresses
Argentine musical theatre actresses
Argentine musical theatre directors
Argentine musical theatre female dancers
Argentine musical theatre women singers
Argentine musical theatre producers
Argentine stage actresses
Argentine television actresses
Argentine vedettes
Singers from Buenos Aires
21st-century Argentine dancers
20th-century Argentine dancers
21st-century Argentine  women singers
20th-century Argentine women  singers
Participants in Argentine reality television series
Bailando por un Sueño (Argentine TV series) participants
Bailando por un Sueño (Argentine TV series) winners